The Guisane is a river in the Hautes-Alpes department, Provence-Alpes-Côte d'Azur region of France, a subtributary of the Rhône and tributary of the Durance (in Briançon). It takes its source in Le Monêtier-les-Bains at the Col du Lautaret.

References 

Rivers of France
Rivers of Hautes-Alpes
Rivers of Provence-Alpes-Côte d'Azur